Kyjov is a town in Hodonín District in the South Moravian Region of the Czech Republic. It has about 11,000 inhabitants. The historic town centre is well preserved and is protected by law as an urban monument zone.

Administrative parts
The villages Bohuslavice, Boršov and Nětčice are administrative parts of Kyjov.

Geography
It is situated in the valley of the river Kyjovka. Most of the municipal territory lies in the Kyjov Hills, and a small northern part lies in the Chřiby highlands.

History

The first written mention of Kyjov is from 1126. Until 1539, it was a property of the Hradisko Monastery. In the 12th century, a Romanesque church and new market place were established here. In 1201, Kyjov is first referred to as a market town. In 1284, King Wenceslaus II allowed to fortify the market town. Kyjov had no funds for the stone walls and built only wooden palisades.

Due to financial difficulties of the monastery, in the 14th and 15th centuries, Kyjov was pawned to various lower nobles. In 1515, Kyjov became a town. The monastery sold the town in 1539. After it changed its owners few times, in 1548, Kyjov became a royal town, received a royal promise not to be sold or pawned again, and gained an advantageous position that led to further development. The town had repaired buildings, had built three town gates and new Renaissance town hall, and acquired new properties.

In 1710, the first Capuchins came to Kyjov. They had built a new church. In 1784, the Capuchin monastery was abolished. From 1784 to 1848, the town was in good economic condition and expanded. In the second half of the 19th century, Kyjov has a German speaking minory, which included Jewish population.

Until 1918, Gaya in Mähren – Kyjov (previously Gaya or Gaia) was part of the Austrian monarchy (Austria side after the compromise of 1867), head of the district with the same name, one of the 34 Bezirkshauptmannschaften in Moravia.

Demographics

Transport

Kyjov lies on the railway from Brno to Uherské Hradiště. It is served by three railway stations and stops: Kyjov, Kyjov zastávka, and Bohuslavice u Kyjova.

Culture
Kyjov is a centre of regional folklore. The town lies in the cultural region of Moravian Slovakia. The festival Slovácký rok ("Moravian Slovakian Year") is the oldest Moravian folklore festival. It has taken place here since 1921 every four years.

Kyjov participated and won silver in the 2008 Entente Florale.

Sights

The historic centre is formed by the Masarykovo Square and the nearest surroundings. In the middle of the square is a Marian column from the 1720s. The square is dominated by the Renaissance town hall. It was built by Italian architects in 1561–1562. It is decorated by sgraffiti and has a -high tower.

The Church of the Assumption of the Virgin Mary is also located on the town square. It was built in 1713–1720 and extended in 1734. Under the church is a Capuchin tomb with 40 coffins.

The Chateau is the oldest preserved building in the town. It was built in the first half of the 16th century as a manor house and gradually served various purposes. In 1911, it was reconstructed and decorated by sgraffiti. Since 1928, it houses the Kyjov Ethnographic Museum with archeological, ethnographic and natural science expositions.

Notable people

Hugo Sonnenschein (1889–1953), Austrian writer
Radola Gajda (1892–1948), military commander and politician; studied here
Bohumil Sekla (1901–1987), biologist and university professor
Miroslav Novák (1907–2000), theologian and patriarch
Miroslav Tichý (1926–2011), painter and photographer
Ivo Knoflíček (born 1962), footballer
Roman Stantien (born 1964), Slovak ice hockey player
Silvia Saint (born 1976), porn actress
Jan Bárta (born 1984), road cyclist
Jakub Kornfeil (born 1993), motorcycle racer

Twin towns – sister cities

Kyjov is twinned with:
 Biograd na Moru, Croatia
 Hollabrunn, Austria
 Lutsk, Ukraine
 Prizren, Kosovo
 Seravezza, Italy
 Yvetot, France

References

External links

Cities and towns in the Czech Republic
Populated places in Hodonín District
Moravian Slovakia